Protein O-mannosyl-transferase 2 is an enzyme that in humans is encoded by the POMT2 gene.

Function 

POMT2 encodes an integral membrane protein of the endoplasmic reticulum (ER) that shares significant sequence similarity with a family of protein O-mannosyltransferases of S. cerevisiae. For additional background information, see POMT1 (MIM 607423).[supplied by OMIM]

References

Further reading

External links
  GeneReviews/NCBI/NIH/UW entry on Congenital Muscular Dystrophy Overview